The Afghan Ministry of Higher Education is the Government ministry that is in charge of regulating, expanding, and developing Afghanistan's institutions of higher education.

The Ministry is responsible for the training of teachers and for establishing a national higher education curriculum as well as special education programs such as in-service training and promoting further education for university faculty members.

The Ministry also develops partnerships with international universities, organizes seminars and conferences, ensures that residential accommodation is available for students and teachers of universities and provides expertise and training in accounting, management procedures, and computer literacy.

Ministers

See also
Higher education in Afghanistan

References

External links
 
 Official Website Ministry of Higher Education

Higher Education
Afghanistan, Higher Education